The UK Singles Chart is one of many music charts compiled by the Official Charts Company that calculates the best-selling singles of the week in the United Kingdom. Before 2004, the chart was only based on the sales of physical singles. This list shows singles that peaked in the Top 10 of the UK Singles Chart during 1972, as well as singles which peaked in 1971 and 1973 but were in the top 10 in 1972. The entry date is when the single appeared in the top 10 for the first time (week ending, as published by the Official Charts Company, which is six days after the chart is announced).

One-hundred and twenty-three singles were in the top ten in 1972. Seven singles from 1971 remained in the top 10 for several weeks at the beginning of the year, while "Nights in White Satin" by The Moody Blues", "Shotgun Wedding" by Roy "C" and "Solid Gold Easy Action" by T. Rex were all released in 1972 but did not reach their peak until 1973. "Something Tells Me (Something's Gonna Happen Tonight)" by Cilla Black was the only single from 1971 to reach its peak in 1972. Twenty-one artists scored multiple entries in the top 10 in 1972. 10cc, Alice Cooper, Donny Osmond, Electric Light Orchestra, Lynsey de Paul, Roxy Music and Gary Glitter were among the many artists who achieved their first UK charting top 10 single in 1972.

The 1971 Christmas number-one, "Ernie (The Fastest Milkman in the West)" by Benny Hill, remained at number-one for the first weeks of 1972. The first new number-one single of the year was "I'd Like to Teach the World to Sing (In Perfect Harmony)" by The New Seekers. Overall, seventeen different singles peaked at number-one in 1972, with T. Rex and Slade (2) having the joint most singles hit that position.

Background

Multiple entries
One-hundred and twenty-three singles charted in the top 10 in 1972, with one-hundred and fourteen singles reaching their peak this year.

Twenty-one artists scored multiple entries in the top 10 in 1972. T. Rex secured the record for most top 10 hits in 1972 with six hit singles. This included their number two entry from November 1971, "Jeepster". The group's first two new entries of the year, "Telegram Sam" and "Metal Guru", both reached number-one, while "Children of the Revolution" and "Solid Gold Easy Action" both peaked at number two, although the latter hit its peak position in January 1973. The double-A side single "Debora"/"One Inch Rock" was a re-release of two songs first issued in 1968 which had failed to reach the top 10, recorded under their previous name Tyrannosaurus Rex.

Michael Jackson's five top 10 hits in 1972 counted December's "Lookin' Through the Windows" as part of The Jackson 5, which reached number 9, alongside four solo singles. The highest charting of these was the number 3 entry "Rockin' Robin" in June, several months after "Got to Be There" had peaked at number 5. A cover of "Ain't No Sunshine" made number eight, with his haul rounded off by "Ben" which scraped in at number seven.

Donny Osmond achieved four top 10 entries this year, three of which were as a solo artist. His debut entry "Puppy Love" spent five weeks at number-one in July and August, while the singles "Too Young" and "Why" peaked at numbers five and three respectively. He also featured on The Osmonds' hit single "Crazy Horses", which reached number two in November.

Elvis Presley, Gilbert O'Sullivan, Rod Stewart and Slade were the other artists with four singles in the top 10 during 1972.

David Cassidy scored three top 10 entries in 1972, two of which were as a solo artist. His debut entry "Could It Be Forever"/"Cherish", reached number two in May, while his cover of The Young Rascals' "How Can I Be Sure" topped the chart for two weeks in September and October. Cassidy also featured on The Partridge Family's cover of Neil Sedaka's "Breaking Up Is Hard to Do", which peaked at number three in August. The New Seekers was the other act to make three appearances in the top 10 this year.

Don McLean was one of a number of artists with two top-ten entries, including the number-one single "Vincent". Alice Cooper, Cher, Elton John, Lindisfarne and The Supremes were among the other artists who had multiple top 10 entries in 1972.

Chart debuts
Forty-seven artists achieved their first top 10 single in 1972, either as a lead or featured artist. Of these, four went on to record another hit single that year: Don McLean, Gary Glitter, Lindisfarne and Little Jimmy Osmond. David Cassidy recorded two other top 10 hits in 1972. Donny Osmond had three other entries in his breakthrough year.

The following table (collapsed on desktop site) does not include acts who had previously charted as part of a group and secured their first top 10 solo single.

Notes
The line-up of Faces consisted of Rod Stewart, Ronnie Wood and three members of the disbanded Small Faces - Ian McLagan, Kenney Jones and Ronnie Lane. All of them, barring Wood, had previous top 10 singles to their name, the most recent to debut being Stewart with "Maggie May"/"Reason to Believe" in 1971.

Michael Jackson had four entries as a solo artist this year for the first time, alongside a single with his group The Jackson 5. The band had debuted in 1970 with their breakthrough hit "I Want You Back". Wings was a side-project for Paul McCartney after the dissolution of legendary group The Beatles following the end of 1960s Beatlemania.

Jonathan King charted under the pseudonym Shag in 1972 for the first time with the song "Loop di Love". He had appeared in the chart in 1965 with "Everyone's Gone to the Moon", but used his own name. Junior Campbell left Marmalade in 1971 and just a year later he celebrated a top 10 solo single, "Hallelujah Freedom".

Songs from films
The only song from a film to enter the top 10 in 1972 was "Ben" (from Ben). Additionally, the melody from "The Young New Mexican Puppeteer" was adapted from the score to the 1940 film Pinocchio.

Best-selling singles
The Pipes & Drums & the Military Band of the Royal Scots Dragoon Guards had the best-selling single of the year with "Amazing Grace". The song spent nine weeks in the top 10 (including five weeks at number one), sold over 890,000 copies and was certified by the BPI. "Mouldy Old Dough" by Lieutenant Pigeon came in second place, selling more than 790,000 copies and losing out by around 100,000 sales. Donny Osmond's "Puppy Love", "Without You" from Nilsson and "I'd Like to Teach the World to Sing (In Perfect Harmony)" by The New Seekers made up the top five. Songs by Chicory Tip, Gary Glitter, T. Rex ("Metal Guru"), Neil Reid and T. Rex ("Telegram Sam") were also in the top ten best-selling singles of the year.

Top-ten singles
Key

Entries by artist

The following table shows artists who achieved two or more top 10 entries in 1972, including singles that reached their peak in 1971 or 1973. The figures include both main artists and featured artists, while appearances on ensemble charity records are also counted for each artist. The total number of weeks an artist spent in the top ten in 1972 is also shown.

Notes

 "Mother of Mine" re-entered the top 10 at number 10 on 18 March 1972 (week ending).
 "Blue Is the Colour" was released by Chelsea F.C. to celebrate reaching the League Cup Final.
 "Beg, Steal or Borrow" was the United Kingdom's entry at the Eurovision Song Contest in 1972.
 "Come What May (Après toi)" was Luxembourg's winning entry at the Eurovision Song Contest in 1972.
 "Debora" and "One Inch Rock" were originally released as individual singles in 1968 under T. Rex's former name Tyrannosaurus Rex, peaking at number 34 and number 28 respectively. 
 "Leeds United" was released by Leeds United F.C. to celebrate reaching the FA Cup Final.
 "It's Four in the Morning" re-entered the top 10 at number 6 on 2 September 1972 (week ending) for 6 weeks.
 "In a Broken Dream" features uncredited lead vocals from Rod Stewart.
 "Leader of the Pack" originally peaked outside the top 10 at number 11 on its initial release in 1965.
 "Let's Dance" originally peaked at number 2 on its initial release in 1962.
 "Shotgun Wedding" re-entered the top 10 at number 8 on 6 January 1973 (week ending). It originally peaked at number 6 on its initial release in 1966.
 Figure includes single that peaked in 1971.
 Figure includes single that peaked in 1973.
 Figure includes the double A-side single "Debora"/"One Inch Rock" recorded under the name Tyrannosaurus Rex.
 Figure includes a top 10 hit with the group The Jackson 5.
 Figure includes a top 10 hit with the group The Osmonds.
 Figure includes a top 10 hit with the group The Partridge Family.
 Figure includes a top 10 hit with the group Faces.
 Figure includes a top 10 hit in the duo Sonny and Cher.

See also
1972 in British music
List of number-one singles from the 1970s (UK)

References
General

Specific

External links
1972 singles chart archive at the Official Charts Company (click on relevant week)

Top 10 singles
United Kingdom
1972